The Fawn is a 1997 album by The Sea and Cake.

Critical reception
The A.V. Club wrote that "everything The Sea and Cake touches turns to sweet, surprising, deadpan pop magic." The Washington Post called the songs "relatively pithy," writing that the band "doesn't try to overwhelm, but it underwhelms quite agreeably." CMJ New Music Monthly wrote that "fans of the earlier records will find The Fawn surprisingly dense-sounding, with its base layer of drum and keyboard filling the rests where silence used to be."

Track listing
 "Sporting Life" – 4:54
 "The Argument" – 5:02
 "The Fawn" – 3:07
 "The Ravine" – 3:18
 "Rossignol" – 3:30
 "There You Are" – 4:48
 "Civilise" – 3:21
 "Bird and Flag" – 3:51
 "Black Tree in the Bee Yard" – 3:04
 "Do Now Fairly Well" – 5:51

Personnel
Sam Prekop – vocals, guitar
Archer Prewitt – guitar, organ, vibes
Eric Claridge – bass
John McEntire – drums, electric piano

References

The Sea and Cake albums
1997 albums
Thrill Jockey albums